Hornbacher is a surname. Notable people with the surname include:

Marya Hornbacher (born 1974), American writer and journalist
Scott Hornbacher, American television producer and director

See also
Hornbacher's, an American supermarket chain